Goishicha ( 'go-pebble tea') is a fermented tea originally from China but now grown only in Ōtoyo, Kōchi and Ishizuchi-Kurocha, Ehime prefecture. The tea is made by fermenting harvested tea in a two step process, first with aerobic fungi, then with anaerobic bacteria.

References

Fermented tea
Japanese tea